In mathematics, the Dyson conjecture  is a conjecture about the constant term of certain Laurent polynomials, proved independently in 1962 by Wilson and Gunson. Andrews generalized it to the q-Dyson conjecture, proved by Zeilberger and Bressoud and sometimes called the Zeilberger–Bressoud theorem. Macdonald generalized it further to more general root systems with the Macdonald constant term conjecture, proved by Cherednik.

Dyson conjecture

The Dyson conjecture states that the Laurent polynomial

has constant term

The case  n = 3 of Dyson's conjecture follows from the Dixon identity.

 and  used a computer to find expressions for non-constant coefficients of
Dyson's Laurent polynomial.

Dyson integral
When all the values ai  are equal to β/2, the constant term in Dyson's conjecture is the value of Dyson's integral

Dyson's integral is a special case of Selberg's integral after a change of variable and has value

which gives another proof of Dyson's conjecture in this special case.

q-Dyson conjecture
 found a q-analog of Dyson's conjecture, stating that the constant term of 

is 

Here (a;q)n is the q-Pochhammer symbol.
previous work of Ira Gessel and Dominique Foata. A shorter proof, using formal Laurent series, was given in 2004 by Ira Gessel and Guoce Xin, and
an even shorter proof, using a quantitative form, due to Karasev and Petrov, and independently to Lason, of Noga Alon's Combinatorial Nullstellensatz,
was given in 2012 by Gyula Karolyi and Zoltan Lorant Nagy.
The latter method was extended, in 2013, by Shalosh B. Ekhad and Doron Zeilberger to derive explicit expressions of any specific coefficient, not just the
constant term, see http://www.math.rutgers.edu/~zeilberg/mamarim/mamarimhtml/qdyson.html, for detailed references.

Macdonald conjectures
 extended the conjecture to arbitrary finite or affine root systems, with Dyson's original conjecture corresponding to 
the case of the An−1 root system and Andrews's conjecture corresponding to the affine An−1 root system. Macdonald reformulated these conjectures as conjectures about the norms of Macdonald polynomials. Macdonald's conjectures were proved by  using doubly affine Hecke algebras.

Macdonald's form of Dyson's conjecture for root systems of type BC is closely related to Selberg's integral.

References

Enumerative combinatorics
Algebraic combinatorics
Factorial and binomial topics
Mathematical identities
Freeman Dyson
Conjectures that have been proved